The Confederation of Mongolian Trade Unions (CMTU) (Mongolyn Üildverchnii Evlelüüdiin Kholboo) is a national trade union center in Mongolia. It was founded in 1927 as the Central Council of Mongolian Trade Unions.

The CMTU was affiliated with the World Federation of Trade Unions until 1991. It has since joined the International Trade Union Confederation.

CMTU was previously tied to the Mongolian People's Revolutionary Party, but in 1990 the link between the party and trade union was broken.

See also

Confederation of Free Trade Unions

References

External links
 CMTU Official site.

Trade unions in Mongolia
International Trade Union Confederation
Trade unions established in 1927